Putz may refer to:

 Christmas putz, decorative miniature village elaborated from a nativity scene
 Putz (surname)

See also
 Dick Putz Field, stadium in Saint Cloud, Minnesota
 Putt's Law
 List of Yiddish loanwords#P